The God of Music 2 is a South Korean mockumentary TV show.

Cast
 Lee Sang-min
 Tak Jae-hoon
 Kim Ga-eun
 Baek Young-kwang
 Kim Ji-hyang
 Muzie
 Jinyoung
 Park Kyung-ri
 Lee Soo-min
 Kim So-hee
 Yoon Chae-kyung
 Lee Su-hyun
 Lee Hae-in
 Sleepy
 DinDin

C.I.V.A

C.I.V.A is a girl group created through The God of Music 2. So named because the group strives to be better than Diva, "so they put C instead of D there". However, the name has to be spelled out because pronouncing it as a single word sounds like a curse word in Korean.

Discography

References

External links
  

Korean-language television shows
South Korean variety television shows
2010s South Korean television series
2016 South Korean television series debuts
2016 South Korean television series endings
Mockumentary television series